Sphenomorphus taylori, Taylor’s Solomon skink,  is a species of skink found in Bougainville.

References

taylori
Taxa named by Charles Earle Burt
Reptiles described in 1930
Reptiles of the Solomon Islands